The Women's History of the World is a book about women's history written by British author Rosalind Miles Ph.D., first published in 1988. Later editions, including the paperback versions of the book, were titled Who Cooked The Last Supper: The Women's History of the World. The book examines the roles of women, their representation, and their power through history.

Contents 

The book has four parts, each one divided into 3 chapters:

PART I: IN THE BEGINNING
1. The First Women
2. The Great Goddess
3. The Rise of the Phallus
PART II: THE FALL OF WOMAN
4. God the Father
5. The Sins of the Mothers
6. A Little Learning
PART III: DOMINION AND DOMINATION
7. Woman's Work
8. Revolution, the Great Engine
9. The Rod of Empire
PART IV: TURNING THE TIDE
10. The Rights of Woman
11. The Body Politic
12. Daughters of Time

See also
 Women in World History

1988 non-fiction books
Feminist books
History of women in the United Kingdom
Michael Joseph books